Sofie Lippert Troelsen (born 20 December 1995) is a Danish politician and member of the Folketing, the national legislature. A member of the Green Left party, she has represented East Jutland since November 2022.

Lippert was born on 20 December 1995 in Copenhagen. She grew up in Åbyhøj in Aarhus and was educated at Gammelgaardsskolen and Århus Statsgymnasium. She has a Bachelor of Mathematics degree from the Aarhus University (2019). She was a broadcaster on Radio24syv (2020-2022), political consultant for the Danish IT Society (2021), student assistant at the University of Copenhagen (2021-2022) and an assistant teacher at Gentofte HF (2021).

Notes

References

External links

1995 births
21st-century Danish women politicians
Aarhus University alumni
Living people
Members of the Folketing 2022–2026
People from Aarhus
Socialist People's Party (Denmark) politicians
Women members of the Folketing